Na Wspólnej ("On Wspólna Street") is a Polish television soap opera. It has been running since 2003 on the TVN channel as its flagship primetime weekday soap opera. It is loosely based on the German production Unter uns and it follows the lives of the inhabitants of an apartment block in Wspólna Street, Warsaw. Episodes tend to last around 20 minutes (without commercials). It is a Polish version of the Hungarian Barátok közt. After about 100 episodes production started to create own storylines.

The series is shot almost entirely in Warsaw and produced by the Polish branch of Fremantle Media. Na Wspólnej is the second Polish television soap opera ever to exceed the number of 3,000 episodes.

Cast and characters

Main Characters currently; Other characters

More information about cast: https://filmpolski.pl/fp/index.php?film=1211953

Original characters
Karolina Brzozowska (Matylda Damięcka), Weronika Roztocka (Renata Dancewicz), Maria Zięba (Bożena Dykiel), Maks Brzozowski (Adam Fidusiewicz), Bartek Krzeptowski (Michał Gadomski), Ewa Ostrowska (Ewa Gawryluk), Monika Cieślik (Sylwia Gliwa), Gabriela Nowak (Ewa Gorzelak), Włodzimierz Zięba (Mieczysław Hryniewicz), Marta Leśniewska (Joanna Jabłczyńska), Izabela Brzozowska (Anna Korcz), Michał Brzozowski (Robert Kudelski), Leszek Nowak (Wojciech Majchrzak), Kamil Hoffer (Kazimierz Mazur), Roman Hoffer (Waldemar Obłoza), Andrzej Brzozowski (Tomasz Schimscheiner), Daniel Brzozowski (Michał Tomala), Igor Nowak (Jakub Wesołowski), Konrad Bartczak (Marcin Władyniak), Barbara Brzozowska (Grażyna Wolszczak), Kinga Brzozowska (Ilona Wrońska). (Bold characters appear in the series).

Series list

Notable characters – Klaudia Bracka
Klaudia Bracka, played by Polish actress Julia Trembecka, is one of the most notable "lesbian" person, in contemporary Polish pop culture. She is in an "lesbian" romantic relationship with a "bisexual" girl, Aleksandra Zimińska.

Notable characters – Aleksandra Zimińska
Aleksandra Zimińska is most notable bisexual person, probably only, in contemporary Polish pop culture. Aleksandra Zimińska is in a lesbian romantic relationship with lesbian girl, Klaudia Bracka.

References

External links
 Official website (in Polish)
 
 TVN (Polish Network) TV series

2003 Polish television series debuts
2000s Polish television series
2010s Polish television series
2020s Polish television series
Lesbian-related television shows
Polish television soap operas
Television shows set in Warsaw
TVN (Polish TV channel) original programming